Robert Richard Kudelski (born March 3, 1964) is an American former professional ice hockey player. He was drafted by the Los Angeles Kings in the 1986 NHL Supplemental Draft.

Playing career

The Hill School Blues 
Kudelski played a year of prep school hockey at The Hill School under Hill coach Tom Eccleston.

Yale Bulldogs (1983-1987)
Kudelski played with the Yale Bulldogs of the ECAC, beginning in the 1983-84 season, where as a freshman, Kudelski had 14 goals and 26 points in 21 games.  In 1984-85, Kudelski saw an increase in his offensive production, scoring 21 goals and 44 points in 32 games with Yale.  Kudelski saw a slight decrease in his offense in 1985-86, scoring 18 goals and 41 points in 31 games.  In his final season with the Bulldogs in 1986-87, Kudelski had his best collegiate season, scoring 25 goals and 47 points in 30 games, and was named as a First All-Star in the ECAC.

Los Angeles Kings (1987-1993)
Kudelski was drafted by the Los Angeles Kings first overall in the 1986 NHL Supplemental Draft.

Kudelski began the 1987-88 with the Kings, and appeared in his first career NHL game on October 8, 1987, as he was held off the scoresheet in a 4-1 loss to the New York Islanders.  On November 19, in his 17th game, Kudelski earned his first career NHL point, an assist, in a 7-5 loss to the Philadelphia Flyers.  That would be the only point Kudelski would register in his rookie season, as he played in 26 games.  Following the Kings game on December 10, the club sent Kudelski to their AHL affiliate, the New Haven Nighthawks, where he finished the 1987-88 season.  With the Nighthawks, Kudelski scored 15 goals and 34 points in 50 games, however, the club failed to reach the post-season.

He split the 1988-89 season between the Kings and Nighthawks.  While with Los Angeles, Kudelski scored his first career NHL goal on February 12, 1989, against Alain Chevrier of the Chicago Blackhawks in a 6-2 win.  Overall, in 14 games with the Kings, Kudelski had a goal and four points.  In 60 games with New Haven, Kudelski scored 32 goals and 51 points, helping the club reach the playoffs.  In 17 post-season games, Kudelski had eight goals and 13 points, as the Nighthawks lost in the Calder Cup finals to the Adirondack Red Wings.

Kudelski made the Kings for good in the 1989-90 season, and got off to a fast start, scoring five goals and nine points in his first six games.  Kudelski finished the season with 23 goals and 36 points in 62 games, helping Los Angeles reach the playoffs.  On April 12, Kudelski earned his first career playoff point, an assist, in a 5-1 loss to the Calgary Flames.  On April 24, he scored his first career playoff goal against Bill Ranford of the Edmonton Oilers in a 6-5 loss.  Overall, in eight playoff games, Kudelski had a goal and three points.

In 1990-91, Kudelski played in 72 games with the Kings, scoring 23 goals and 36 points for the second straight season, helping Los Angeles into the playoffs once again.  On January 9, Kudelski earned his first career hat trick, scoring three goals on three shots against Kirk McLean of the Vancouver Canucks in a 6-2 victory.  In the post-season, Kudelski scored three goals and five points in eight games.

Kudelski appeared in all 80 games with the Kings in 1991-92, scoring 22 goals and 43 points.  On October 16, Kudelski set a career high with four points in a game, as he scored a hat trick and added an assist, as Los Angeles defeated the San Jose Sharks 8-5.  In the post-season, Kudelski appeared in all six games, however, he was held off the scoresheet.

Kudelski began the 1992-93 season with the Kings, as he scored three goals and six points in 15 games.  On December 19, the Kings traded Kudelski and Shawn McCosh to the Ottawa Senators for Marc Fortier and Jim Thomson.

Ottawa Senators (1992-1994)
Kudelski finished the 1992-93 season with the expansion Ottawa Senators, where in 48 games, he scored 21 goals and 35 points.  On January 10, Kudelski recorded his first career hat trick with the Senators, scoring three goals in a 3-2 victory over the San Jose Sharks.

In 1993-94, Kudelski had a breakout season, where in 42 games with Ottawa, he had 26 goals and 41 points.  His time with the Senators came to an end though, as the club traded Kudelski to the Florida Panthers for Evgeny Davydov, Scott Levins, the Panthers sixth round draft pick in the 1994 NHL Entry Draft, and the Dallas Stars fourth round draft pick, previously acquired by Florida, in the 1995 NHL Entry Draft.

Florida Panthers (1993-1996)
Kudelski finished the 1993-94 season with the Florida Panthers, and represented the club in the 1994 NHL All-Star Game held at Madison Square Garden.  Kudelski scored the first goal for the Eastern Conference along with the game-tying goal, as the Eastern Conference defeated the Western Conference by a score of 9-8.

On January 13, 1994, his wife Marie-France gave birth to their daughter Jessica, named the first Panther baby, who was the first child born to a player of the new team.

In 44 games with the Panthers, Kudelski scored 14 goals and 29 points.  Kudelski tied an NHL record, as he played in 86 regular season games: 42 with Ottawa and 44 with Florida, during the season.

Kudelski's offensive production dropped drastically in 1994-95, as he scored six goals and nine points in 26 games in the lockout shortened season.

Kudelski continued to struggle in the 1995-96 season, earning only one assist in 13 games with the Panthers. He also spent some time with the Carolina Monarchs of the AHL, scoring a goal in four games. After the season, Kudelski officially retired from hockey.

Career statistics

Regular season and playoffs

Awards and honors

Transactions
Traded to Ottawa by Los Angeles with Shawn McCosh for Marc Fortier and Jim Thomson, December 19, 1992.
Traded to Florida by Ottawa for Evgeny Davydov, Scott Levins, Florida's 6th-round choice (Mike Gaffney) in 1994 Entry Draft, and Dallas' 4th-round choice (previously acquired, Ottawa selected Kevin Bolibruck) in 1995 Entry Draft, January 6, 1994.

References

External links
 

1964 births
Living people
American men's ice hockey centers
American people of Ukrainian descent
Carolina Monarchs players
Florida Panthers players
Ice hockey players from Massachusetts
Los Angeles Kings draft picks
Los Angeles Kings players
National Hockey League All-Stars
National Hockey League supplemental draft picks
New Haven Nighthawks players
Ottawa Senators players
Sportspeople from Springfield, Massachusetts
Yale Bulldogs men's ice hockey players
The Hill School alumni